"Alles verloren" (literally "Lost everything") is the first single by German rapper Bushido's album 7.

Song information 
With this track, Bushido fired back at his critical reviewers by declaring that he will never shut his mouth and he will continue with provocative songs until the reviewers stop their criticism.

Track list 
 Alles verloren (album version) (4:29) 
 Alles verloren  (video) (4:18)

Charts

Weekly charts

Year-end charts

Certifications

External links

References

2007 singles
Bushido (rapper) songs
2007 songs
German-language songs